Isabel Lois Perry Neill (November 12, 1896 in Washington – February 12, 1978 in Yakima, Washington) was a newspaper writer.

Early life
Isabel Lois Perry Neill was born in 1896, the daughter of William Alan Perry (born in 1854) and Marie Strachey.

Career
She was a newspaper writer. She contributed verse and children's stories to several magazines of national circulation. 

She was a member of the Woman's Century Club and the American Legion Auxiliary.

Personal life
Isabel Neill moved to Yakima, Washington in 1921 and lived at 913 Broadway. She married Paul Neill.

References

1896 births
1978 deaths
20th-century American writers
20th-century American women writers
People from Yakima, Washington
Writers from Washington (state)